Sylfaen Halt railway station, located in the tiny hamlet of Sylfaen on the A548, is an unstaffed request halt on the narrow gauge Welshpool and Llanfair Light Railway  from the Welshpool Raven Square terminus. It has a short platform and waiting shelter.

Opened as Sylfaen Farm Siding in 1904 it was renamed 'Sylfaen Halt' on 1 February 1913. Sylfaen was closed to passengers on 9 February 1931.

Originally the halt had a short goods siding. Parcels could be left in a box and a special blast on the engine's whistle indicated items to be collected. The Great Western Railway withdrew passenger services in 1931.   and the line closed completely on 3 November 1956.

By 1972 the line had been restored as far as Sylfaen and the station was provided with a passing loop that at present has track but no points.

Notes

References 
 
 Rushton, Gordon (2015). The Welshpool & Llanfair Railway  Travellers's Guide. Llanfair Caereinion : Welshpool & Llanfair Railway.

External links
 Video footage of Sylfaen Halt
 3 minutes from Welshpool to Llanfair Caereinion

Welshpool and Llanfair Light Railway
Heritage railway stations in Powys
Former Cambrian Railway stations
Railway stations in Great Britain opened in 1904
Railway stations in Great Britain closed in 1931
Railway stations in Great Britain opened in 1972